Waun Mawn (Welsh for "peat moor") is the site of a possible dismantled Neolithic stone circle in the Preseli Hills of Pembrokeshire, Wales. The diameter of the postulated circle is estimated to be , the third largest diameter for a British stone circle.

This tract of moorland sits on the southern slopes of the  hill top of Cnwc yr Hŷdd, just to the north of the broad east-west ridge of the Preseli range.

There are four remaining stones, one standing and three prostrate.

Recent findings
During 2017 and 2018, excavations by the UCL team of archaeologist Mike Parker Pearson, led to a proposal that the site had originally housed a  diameter stone circle of the same size as the ditch at Stonehenge The archaeologists also postulated that the circle also contained a hole from one stone which had a distinctive pentagonal shape, very closely matching the one pentagonal stone at Stonehenge (stonehole 91 at Waun Mawn and stone 62 at Stonehenge).  Both circles appear, according to some researchers, to be oriented towards the midsummer solstice.

Following soil dating of the sediments within the postulated stone holes, via optically stimulated luminescence (OSL), it has been argued, by Parker Pearson, that the circle of stones was built c. 3400–3200 BC and then, before 2120 BC, was disassembled, dragged across land and reassembled at Stonehenge in Wiltshire, some  distant. Parker Pearson's proposals have been published in the journal Antiquity. This postulated migration of the stones was likened by the researchers to the story told by Geoffrey of Monmouth, in his 12th-century History of the Kings of Britain, of Merlin taking the stones of the Giant's Dance circle in Ireland to Stonehenge.

The site and its connection with Stonehenge was the subject of the BBC Two programme, Stonehenge: The Lost Circle Revealed, with Parker Pearson and Professor Alice Roberts. Broadcast was on 12 February 2021, and reported in New Scientist on 20 February 2021.

The evidence for stone sockets and alignments, and the interpretations of features as components of a lost giant stone circle, have been strongly criticised by Dr Brian John. He also argued that no evidence had ever been found to establish any link with Stonehenge.

Work in 2021 led Pearson and his colleagues to conclude that only 30% of the proposed stone circle at Waun Mawn had been completed, but that perhaps as many as 17 stones had been erected so between eight and 13 had been removed in antiquity, far fewer than the perhaps 80 bluestones that once stood at Stonehenge. That work uncovered no new evidence connecting Waun Mawn and Stonehenge.

Two geological articles published in 2022 showed that there is no link between Waun Mawn and the supposed "bluestone quarries" at Craig Rhosyfelin and Carn Goedog, and no link between Waun Mawn and Stonehenge.

References

External links
 The Lost Circle at Waun Mawn: a commentary, on Researchgate.net, February 2021
 Standing stone at Waun Mawn from geograph.org.uk
 Waun Mawn (Tafarn y Bwlch) at megalithic.co.uk, updated 2018

Stone circles in Wales
Monuments and memorials in Pembrokeshire
Buildings and structures completed in the 4th millennium BC